Frank E. Smith (born July 31, 1952) is an American former politician who served in the Kansas State Senate and Kansas House of Representatives as a Democrat during the 1970s. He was in the House for one term, from 1975 to 1976, and then served one term in the state senate, from 1977 to 1980.

References

1952 births
Living people
Democratic Party Kansas state senators
Democratic Party members of the Kansas House of Representatives
20th-century American politicians
Politicians from Olathe, Kansas